Danilovgrad Municipality is one of the municipalities of Montenegro. The administrative center is town of Danilovgrad. The municipality is located in the central region of Montenegro in the valley of Zeta river, sometimes called also the Bjelopavlići plain, after the name of the local tribe.

Tourism and location
Main tourist attraction within Danilovgrad municipality is Ostrog Monastery, famous orthodox pilgrimage site visited by believers from afar. Other notable points of interest are Ždrebaonik Monastery and well of Glava Zete. Municipality lies along the main route between Montenegro's two largest cities, Podgorica and Nikšić. Via villages, Danilovgrad forms part of a conurbation with Podgorica.

Local parliament

Demographics
Town of Danilovgrad is the center of the Danilovgrad Municipality, which in 2003 had a population of 16,523.

Population of Danilovgrad:
March 3, 1981 - 3,664
March 3, 1991 - 4,409
November 1, 2003 - 5,208

Ethnic groups (2003 census):
Montenegrins (67.84%)
Serbs (25.51%)

Gallery

References

 
Municipalities of Montenegro